The water polo events at the 2005 World Aquatics Championships were held from 17 to 30 July 2005, in Montréal, Canada.

Medal summary

Medal table

Medalists

References

 
2005
World Aquatics Championships
Water polo